Adolphe Jordan-Martin (11 July 1845 – 27 May 1900) was a Swiss politician and President of the Swiss Council of States (1895/1896).

External links 
 
 

1845 births
1900 deaths
Members of the Council of States (Switzerland)
Presidents of the Council of States (Switzerland)
Free Democratic Party of Switzerland politicians